The Cima di Jazzi (English: Jazzi Peak) is a mountain of the Pennine Alps, located on the Swiss-Italian border, just north of Monte Rosa. It overlooks Macugnaga on its east (Italian) side. The west (Swiss) side is entirely covered by glaciers.

Geography 
The SOIUSA partition of the Alps places the mountain in the Monte Rosa group of the alpine subsection Eastern Aosta and Northern Valsesia Alps (Pennine Alps); its code is: I/B-9.III-A.3.a.

Mountain huts 
 Rifugio Eugenio Sella,
 Bivacco Città di Luino,
 Monte Rosa Hütte.

References

External links
 Cima di Jazzi on Hikr

Mountains of the Alps
Alpine three-thousanders
Mountains of Piedmont
Italy–Switzerland border
International mountains of Europe
Mountains of Valais
Mountains of Switzerland